Princess Virtue is a 1917 American silent drama film directed by Robert Z. Leonard and starring Mae Murray, Lule Warrenton and Wheeler Oakman. An incomplete copy was found and kept in the Library of Congress. Prints and/or fragments were found in the Dawson Film Find in 1978.

Cast
 Mae Murray as Lianne Demarest 
 Lule Warrenton as Clare Demarest 
 Wheeler Oakman as Basil Demarest 
 Clarissa Selwynne as Countess Oudoff 
 Gretchen Lederer as Mlle. Sari 
 Harry von Meter as Count Oudoff 
 Paul Nicholson as Baron Strensky 
 Jean Hersholt as Emile Carre

Production
The Hotel del Coronado's Tent City setting is featured in the film.

References

Bibliography
James Robert Parish & Michael R. Pitts. Film directors: a guide to their American films. Scarecrow Press, 1974.

External links
 

1917 films
1917 drama films
1910s English-language films
American silent feature films
Silent American drama films
American black-and-white films
Films directed by Robert Z. Leonard
Universal Pictures films
1910s American films
Films shot in San Diego